Péter Palotás (27 June 1929 – 17 May 1967), born as Péter Poteleczky, was a Hungarian footballer who played as a forward for MTK Budapest FC and Hungary. During the 1950s he was a fringe member of the team known as the Mighty Magyars and played alongside the likes of Ferenc Puskás, Zoltán Czibor, Sándor Kocsis, Nándor Hidegkuti and József Bozsik. Palotás was an early pioneer of the deep-lying centre-forward role and in 1955 he scored the first ever hat-trick in a European Cup game. In 1959 he retired as a player due to a heart condition. The same condition led to his death on 17 May 1967.

Club career
Palotás spent all his playing career at MTK Budapest FC. However, during this time, the club changed their name several times. In 1949, when Hungary became a communist state, MTK were taken over by the secret police, the ÁVH and subsequently the club became known as Textiles SE. They then became Bástya SE, then Vörös Lobogó SE and then finally back to MTK. Despite this turmoil, the 1950s proved a successful era for club and it was while at MTK that Palotás, together with Nándor Hidegkuti and coach Márton Bukovi, pioneered the deep-lying centre-forward position. With a team that also included Mihály Lantos and József Zakariás, MTK and Palotás won three Hungarian League titles, a Hungarian Cup and a Mitropa Cup. In 1955, as Vörös Lobogó SE, they also played in the first ever European Cup. On 7 September 1955 at the Népstadion, Palotás scored a hat-trick as they beat RSC Anderlecht 6–3 in the first leg of the first round. This was the first ever hat-trick scored in a European Cup game. He scored again in the second-leg as Vörös Lobogó SE won 4–1. During the quarter-finals against Stade Reims he scored a further two goals as they lost 8–6 on aggregate and he finished the competition with a total of six goals scored.

International career
Between 1950 and 1956, Palotás won 24 caps and scored 18 goals for Hungary. He scored twice on his debut on 24 September 1950 in a 12–0 win against Albania. In 1952 Palotás scored four goals as he helped Hungary become Olympic Champions. This included two in a 3–0 win against Italy on 21 July. He also played in the final against Yugoslavia on 2 August 1952. On 17 May 1953, he helped Hungary clinch the Central European International Cup when he played in a 3–0 win against Italy at the Stadio Olimpico.

Although teammates at MTK, Palotás and Nándor Hidegkuti were rivals for a place in the national side. By 1953 Hidegkuti had established himself as the first-choice deep-lying centre-forward for Hungary and as a result Palotás missed out on the two prestige friendlies against England. He travelled to England for the first game but remained on the bench. Despite this setback he continued to play regularly for Hungary until 1956. During the 1954 FIFA World Cup he scored twice in the group stage 9–0 win against South Korea and also played in the semi-final against Uruguay. On 19 May 1955 he scored a hat-trick against Finland before playing his last game for Hungary on 9 June 1956 against Portugal.

Honours

Club
MTK Budapest FC
Hungarian League: 1951, 1953, 1958
Hungarian Cup: 1952
Mitropa Cup: 1955

International
Hungary
Olympic Champions: 1952
Central European Champions: 1953
World Cup Runner-up: 1954

Individual
 Hungarian Football Federation Player of the Year: 1951

References

Sources
Behind The Curtain - Travels in Eastern European Football: Jonathan Wilson (2006)

External links
  Article at www.uefa.com
 Hungary stats
 European Cup 1955–56

1929 births
1967 deaths
Footballers from Budapest
Hungarian footballers
MTK Budapest FC players
Footballers at the 1952 Summer Olympics
Olympic footballers of Hungary
Olympic gold medalists for Hungary
1954 FIFA World Cup players
Hungary international footballers
Olympic medalists in football
Medalists at the 1952 Summer Olympics
Association football forwards